Pink Hill is a mountain located in the Catskill Mountains of New York south-southeast of Kingston. Fly Mountain is located southeast, and Golden Hill is located northeast of Pink Hill.

References

Mountains of Ulster County, New York
Mountains of New York (state)